The Solomon Islands sent a delegation to compete at the 1996 Summer Olympics in Atlanta, United States from 19 July to 4 August 1996.  This was the nation's fourth appearance at a Summer Olympic Games.  The delegation to Atlanta consisted of four athletes, three in track and field: Selwyn Kole, Primo Higa, and Nester Geniwala'a; and one in weightlifting: Tony Analau.  None of the athletes made their event final.

Background
The National Olympic Committee of Solomon Islands was recognized by the International Olympic Committee on 31 December 1982.  Having participated in the 1984, 1988, and 1992 Summer Olympics, the Atlanta Olympics were their fourth appearance in Olympic competition. The 1996 Summer Olympics were held from 19 July to 4 August 1996; 10,318 athletes represented 194 National Olympic Committees. The Solomon Islands' delegation to Atlanta consisted of four athletes, three in track and field: Selwyn Kole, Primo Higa, and Nester Geniwala'a; and one in weightlifting: Tony Analau.

Athletics

Selwyn Kole was 22 years old at the time of the Atlanta Olympics, and was making his Olympic debut. In the first round of the men's 1500 meters, held on 29 July, he was drawn into heat five.  He finished in a time of 4 minutes and 3.44 seconds, 12th and last in his heat, and insufficient to advance to the next round.  Primo Higa was 23 years old at the time.  On 29 July, in the first round of the men's 3000 meters steeplechase he failed to finish the race and was eliminated from the competition.  Higa would return four years later to represent the Solomon Islands at the 2000 Summer Olympics.  Nester Geniwala'a was 19 years of age at the time, and making her Olympic debut.  In the first round of the women's 100 meters on 26 July, she was drawn into heat six.  She finished the heat in 13.74 seconds, eighth in her heat. Only the top four from each heat plus to next four overall fastest could advance, and she was eliminated.

Weightlifting

Tony Analau was 27 years old at the time of the Atlanta Olympics, and was making his Olympic debut. He competed in the men's under 64 kilograms category on 22 July.  In the snatch he failed all three attempts to lift 80 kilograms, and was eliminated from the competition.

References

Nations at the 1996 Summer Olympics
1996
1996 in Solomon Islands sport